Triamcinolone aminobenzal benzamidoisobutyrate (TBI-PAB; brand name Taucorten) is a synthetic glucocorticoid corticosteroid which is no longer marketed.

References

Secondary alcohols
Benzamides
Aminobenzals
Corticosteroid cyclic ketals
Corticosteroid esters
Organofluorides
Glucocorticoids
Carboxylate esters
Phenyl compounds
Pregnanes